Asquamiceps is a genus of slickheads that occurs in all oceans. It is one of nineteen genera in the family Alepocephalidae.

Species
There are currently four recognized species in this genus:
 Asquamiceps caeruleus Markle, 1980
 Asquamiceps hjorti (Koefoed, 1927) (Barethroat slickhead)
 Asquamiceps longmani Fowler, 1934
 Asquamiceps velaris Zugmayer, 1911 (Fanfin smooth-head)

References

Alepocephalidae
Ray-finned fish genera
Marine fish genera
Taxa named by Erich Zugmayer